Thiru Ranga is a 2007 Indian masala film directed by Ravi Bhargavan. The film was produced by A. Selvi and Ch. Sathyanarayana in Tamil and in Telugu, the latter as Julayi ( Wanderer). The film stars Santhosh and Ankitha, with Tejashree, Nassar, Jaya Prakash Reddy, Cochin Haneefa and Manivannan playing supporting roles. The Tamil version was released on 11 May 2007 while the Telugu version was released on 31 August 2007.

Plot

Ranga (Santhosh) lives in the city with his housemates : Beeda (Ramesh Khanna), Sunil (Sunil) and Sundaram (Sundar) who believes he is a software engineer. Manga (Tejashree) is in love with Ranga. Ranga is actually a rowdy who works for Rayappan, a local bigwig who conducts his activity under the guise of being a cinema financier. When his friends realise that he is a rowdy, Ranga tells them his past.

In the past, Ranga was a young graduate who was looking for a job. He lived happily with his parents (Nizhalgal Ravi and Kuyili) and his two sisters Deepa (Nanditha Jennifer) and Lakshmi (Seema). They were preparing for Lakshmi's wedding but a lack of money shook up the family and the groom's family was about to stop the marriage. To save Lakshmi's marriage, Deepa took the extreme step of becoming a surrogate mother for money and settled the groom's family. But when their parents knew about this, the marriage was eventually cancelled. The parents prepared a meal which they have poisoned themselves. They all ate it except Ranga and they died. Since that day, Ranga has sworn to make enough money to help the poor families who are in need of money. In the city, he could not find an engineering job and decided to work as a rowdy.

The local bigwig Rayappan (Nassar) and the politician Reddy (Jaya Prakash Reddy) have their eyes on Sree (Ankitha), a leading actress and a philanthropist. Sree turns their offer down and indirectly humiliated them in a public function. So they plan to kidnap her for sexually abusing her. Santosh is selected for the job and kidnaps her. Thereafter, Ranga decides to save Sree for a good heart. Sree also has a bitter past. She was an orphan who was forced by her adopted parents to become an actress. She later emancipated from her parents and left their home.

Ranga fights against all odds and marries Sree. The film ends with Ranga becoming a cinema actor and romancing on screens with Sree.

Cast

Production
Santhosh, who had acted in Ravi Bhargavan previous two films, signed to play the hero while Ankitha has been roped in to play a role which has glamour and serious performance involved.

Soundtrack

The film score and the soundtrack were composed by Soundaryan. The soundtrack, released in 25 April 2007, features 6 tracks with lyrics written by P. Vijay and Na. Muthukumar. The audio of Julayi was launched at Prasad Recording Theatre in Hyderabad on 1 April 2007.

Tamil Version

Telugu Version

Reception
A reviewer from Cinesouth.com said that some scenes reminds one of old films and added that the pace of the first was slow. Another critic gave the film a negative review, and said, "With a plot that stretches the limits of credulity and an uncharismatic cast, it doesn't earn the respect that its name indicates".

References

2007 films
Indian multilingual films
2000s Tamil-language films
2000s Telugu-language films
Indian gangster films
Indian action films
2000s masala films
Films about actors
Films scored by Srikanth Deva
2007 multilingual films
2007 action films